Jin Yugan (26 December 1937 – 26 June 2006) was a Chinese paleontologist and an academician of the Chinese Academy of Sciences. He is distinguished by his research on the stratigraphy of the Carboniferous and Permian.

Biography 
Jin was born in Dongyang County, Zhejiang, on 26 December 1937. Jin graduated in 1959 from the Department of Geology and Paleontology at Nanjing University and involved in the study of brachiopods. 1987, he joined the Chinese Communist Party. 1989, he founded China's first open laboratory for paleobiology and stratigraphy. Subsequently, he researched at Meishan, Sichuan, where the Permian and the transition to the Triassic are well preserved. His research, including the stratigraphy of oil-bearing sediment basins in China and efforts to collaborate scientifically have been rewarded with awards.

In 2001, Jin was elected a member of the Chinese Academy of Sciences. He also served as vice president of the International Palaeontological Association and chairman of the ICS Subcommittee on Permian Stratigraphy and the Lopingium.

On 26 June 2006, he died from an illness in Nanjing, Jiangsu, at the age of 68.

Honours and awards 
 2001 Member of the Chinese Academy of Sciences (CAS)

References 

1937 births
2006 deaths
People from Dongyang
Scientists from Zhejiang
Nanjing University alumni
Members of the Chinese Academy of Sciences